The 1979–80 Liga Alef season saw Hapoel Kiryat Shmona (champions of the North Division) and Maccabi Yavne (champions of the South Division) win the title and promotion to Liga Artzit.

Promotion play-offs, played in two legs, which both held in neutral venue, contested between the second placed clubs in each regional division. Beitar Ramla won over Hapoel Ramat HaSharon, and became the third promoted club.

North Division

South Division

Promotion play-offs

Beitar Ramla promoted to Liga Artzit.

References
Decision about relegation - delayed Maariv, 4.5.80, Historical Jewish Press 
Punishment undermines Hapoel Ramla Maariv, 4.5.80, Historical Jewish Press 
Nahariya - To Liga Bet Maariv, 11.5.80, Historical Jewish Press 
Beitar Ramla - In Artzit Maariv, 18.5.80, Historical Jewish Press 

Liga Alef seasons
Israel
3